Frances Howard Goldwyn (née McLaughlin; June 4, 1903 – July 2, 1976) was an American actress. She was the second wife of producer Samuel Goldwyn, and the paternal grandmother of actors Tony and John Goldwyn.

Early life 
Frances Howard McLaughlin was born in Kansas City, Kansas, or Omaha, Nebraska, in 1903 to Helen Victoria (née Howard) and Charles Douglas McLaughlin. She was raised as a Catholic. Her mother, nicknamed "Bonnie", had been raised a Quaker but converted to Catholicism, predeceasing her daughter by only five years. Her father was reportedly a grandson of Irish nationalist politician Daniel O'Connell. Howard had two sisters and a brother.

Career 
Howard began her professional career at age 16 with a stock theater company. When she was 21, Howard portrayed a flapper on Broadway in The Intimate Stranger. She followed that part with another flapper role in The Best People. Paramount signed her to a five-year contract, and she co-starred in the film The Swan. She also appeared in Too Many Kisses (1925). She had the contract canceled when she decided to marry.

Personal life 
Howard married Samuel Goldwyn, more than two decades her senior, on April 23, 1925. They remained married until Goldwyn's death on January 31, 1974. They had one son, Samuel Goldwyn Jr.; their grandsons are actors Tony and John Goldwyn.

Death
On July 2, 1976, at the age of 73, Howard died in Beverly Hills, California more than a year after being diagnosed with advanced cancer, for which she refused treatment which would have required invasive and disfiguring surgery. She was interred next to her husband at Forest Lawn Memorial Park, Glendale.

Filmography
Howard made four films between 1925 and 1935:
 Too Many Kisses (1925) as Yvonne Hurja
 The Swan (1925) as Alexandra, The Swan
 The Shock Punch (1925) as Dorothy Clark
 Mary Burns, Fugitive (1935) as Landlady

Legacy
The Hollywood Branch Library in the Hollywood neighborhood of Los Angeles is named for Howard and acts as an archival repository for many film history collections. The library was funded by The Samuel Goldwyn Foundation in 1982 after the predecessor building was destroyed in an arson fire.

References

External links

 
 

1903 births
1976 deaths
American people of Irish descent
American film actresses
American silent film actresses
Actresses from Omaha, Nebraska
Catholics from Nebraska
Catholics from California
People from Greater Los Angeles
Deaths from cancer in California
Burials at Forest Lawn Memorial Park (Glendale)
20th-century American actresses
Goldwyn family
University of Nebraska alumni